Stenodexia is a genus of parasitic flies in the family Tachinidae.

Species
Trafoia arctica (Sack, 1923)
Trafoia gemina Herting, 1966
Trafoia hispida (Wulp, 1890)
Trafoia incarum (Townsend, 1912)
Trafoia insita (Giglio-Tos, 1893)
Trafoia monticola Brauer & von Bergenstamm, 1893
Trafoia rufipalpis (Bigot, 1889)
Trafoia setulosa (Wulp, 1890)
Trafoia trinitatis (Thompson, 1963)

References

Diptera of Europe
Diptera of Asia
Diptera of South America
Diptera of North America
Dexiinae
Tachinidae genera
Taxa named by Friedrich Moritz Brauer
Taxa named by Julius von Bergenstamm